Charol may refer to:

 Charol Shakeshaft, educational researcher
 Dorothea Charol (1889–1963), Russian-born German Art Deco sculptor
 Michael Charol (1894–1970), pseudonym Michael Prawdin, Russian-German historical writer
 Rey Charol (1936–1990), Uruguayan film and television actor
 Kid Charol, ring name of Esteban Gallard (1901–1929), Cuban boxer
 nickname of Jaime González (Colombian footballer) (1938–1985), Colombian footballer

See also
 Charols, a commune in France